The 2016 Washington Huskies football team represented the University of Washington in the 2016 NCAA Division I FBS football season. The team was led by Chris Petersen in his third season as head coach of the Huskies. Washington competed as a member of the North Division of the Pac-12 Conference and played their home games on campus at Husky Stadium in Seattle.

Washington finished the season with a 12–2 overall record and went 8–1 in conference to win the Pac-12 North Division, the program's first division title since the Pac-12 expanded and split into divisions in 2011. Most notable was defeating Stanford and Oregon, two of the toughest annual opponents for the team in recent years, by a combined 114–28. The Stanford game took place in front of a sold out crowd on ESPN and the Oregon game snapped a 12-game losing streak to the Ducks. The Huskies earned a berth in the Pac-12 Championship Game where they defeated Colorado to win their first conference title since 2000. They were selected as the #4 seed in the College Football Playoff and played in the Peach Bowl, where they lost to #1 seed Alabama. Washington was ranked #4 in the final AP Poll of the 2016 season. As of 2022, the 2016 Huskies are the last PAC-12 team to represent the conference in the College Football Playoff.

Previous season
The Huskies finished the 2015 season 7–6 overall and 4–5 in conference, tying for fourth place in the Pac-12 North. They were invited to the Heart of Dallas Bowl where they defeated Southern Miss.

During the offseason, defensive line coach and special teams coordinator Jeff Choate left Washington to accept the head coach position at Montana State. Former Husky defensive back Ikaika Malloe was hired from Utah State to coach the defensive line in 2016, while linebackers coach Bob Gregory took over special teams.

Wide receivers coach Brent Pease did not have his contract renewed following the 2015 season. Pease was replaced by offensive quality control coach Bush Hamdan, who also took on the title of passing game coordinator.

Recruiting class

Personnel

Schedule

Source:

Rankings

Game summaries

Rutgers

Idaho

Portland State

at Arizona

Stanford

at Oregon

Coming off of a 44–6 win against No. 7 Stanford at Husky Stadium, No. 5 Washington traveled to Autzen Stadium to face a 2–3 Oregon team. Prior to this game, Oregon had beaten Washington twelve straight times, ten of which were by a margin of 20 points or more. This was the longest winning streak by either team in the Oregon–Washington football rivalry.

The Oregon winning streak was finally snapped after a 70–21 Washington rout. On the first play from the line of scrimmage, Washington safety Budda Baker, a one-time commit to the Oregon Ducks, intercepted the pass from Oregon's true freshman Justin Herbert. The Huskies took the lead on a Jake Browning touchdown run with 13:23 left in the first quarter and never relinquished it. The Huskies led 35–7 by halftime, 42–7 after the first possession of the third quarter, and 70–21 with 9:58 left in the fourth quarter.

The Washington offense racked up 682 yards of total offense, averaged 10.1 yards per play, amassed 6 passing touchdowns by quarterback Jake Browning, and scored 70 points, the most scored by either team in the rivalry. The Huskies’ 70 points were the second-most an opponent has ever scored on Oregon in Eugene.

Oregon State

at Utah

at California

USC

Arizona State

at Washington State

vs Colorado (Pac-12 Championship Game)

vs Alabama (Peach Bowl - CFP Semifinal)

Awards and honors

Coaches
Chris Petersen - Head Coach
Eddie Robinson Coach of the Year : Finalist
Bobby Dodd Coach of the Year Award : Finalist

Tim Socha - Strength and Conditioning Coach
FootballScoop.com Strength and Conditioning Coach of the Year : Winner

Offense
Jake Browning - Quarterback - Sophomore
Manning Award (quarterback) : Finalist
Walter Camp Award (player of the year) : Finalist
Davey O'Brien Award (quarterback) : Semi-Finalist
Maxwell Award (player of the year) : Semi-Finalist

John Ross III - Wide receiver -  Junior
Biletnikoff Award (wide receiver) : Semi-Finalist

Jeff Lindquist - Tight end -  Senior
Wuerffel Trophy (community service and academic excellence) : Semi-Finalist

Defense
Budda Baker - Safety - Junior
Chuck Bednarik Award (defensive player of the year) : Semi-Finalist
Lott IMPACT Trophy (defensive player of the year) : Semi-Finalist
Jim Thorpe Award (defensive back) : Semi-Finalist

All-Americans
First Team
Budda Baker - The Sporting News, FWAA, ESPN, Sports Illustrated
John Ross III - ESPN
Second Team
Budda Baker - AFCA, The Associated Press, CBS Sports
Sidney Jones - Sports Illustrated
John Ross III - FWAA, The Associated Press, CBS Sports
Trey Adams - FWAA
Freshman
Taylor Rapp - FWAA, USA Today, ESPN, Pro Football Focus

All-Pac-12 Individual Awards
Offensive Player of the Year
Jake Browning - Quarterback - Sophomore

Freshman Defensive Player of the Year
Taylor Rapp - Safety - Freshman

Football Scholar-Athlete of the Year
Jake Eldrenkamp - Guard -  Senior

Pac-12 All-Conference Team
First Team
Jake Browning - Quarterback - Sophomore
Myles Gaskin - Running back - Sophomore
John Ross III - Wide receiver -  Junior
Trey Adams - Offensive tackle - Sophomore
Jake Eldrenkamp - Guard -  Senior
Elijah Qualls - Defensive tackle -  Junior
Azeem Victor - Linebacker -  Junior
Budda Baker - Safety -  Junior
Sidney Jones - Cornerback -  Junior

Second Team
Coleman Shelton - Center -  Junior
Vita Vea - Defensive tackle -  Sophomore
Keishawn Bierria - Linebacker -  Junior
Dante Pettis - Return specialist -  Junior

Honorable Mention
Darrell Daniels - Tight end - Senior
Greg Gaines - Defensive tackle -  Sophomore
Kevin King - Cornerback - Senior
Drew Sample - Tight end -  Sophomore
Psalm Wooching - Linebacker -  Senior

NFL Draft

NFL Scouting Combine

Seven members of the 2016 team were invited to participate in drills at the 2017 NFL Scouting Combine held between February 28 and March 6, 2017 at Lucas Oil Stadium in Indianapolis, Indiana.

 Top performer

† New combine record

2017 NFL Draft

The 2017 NFL Draft was held at the Philadelphia Museum of Art in Philadelphia on April 27 through April 29, 2017. The following Washington players were either selected or signed as free agents following the draft.

References

Washington
Washington Huskies football seasons
Pac-12 Conference football champion seasons
Washington Huskies football
Washington Huskies football